Synedrellopsis is a genus of South American plants in the tribe Heliantheae within the family Asteraceae.

Species
The only known species is Synedrellopsis grisebachii,  native to Bolivia, Paraguay, and Argentina.

References

Monotypic Asteraceae genera
Heliantheae
Flora of South America